Tetragnatha is a genus of long-jawed orb-weavers found all over the world. It was first described by Pierre André Latreille in 1804, and it contains hundreds of species. Most occur in the tropics and subtropics, and many can run over water. They are commonly called stretch spiders in reference to their elongated body form and their ability to hide on blades of grass or similar elongated substrates by stretching their front legs forward and the others behind them. The name Tetragnatha is derived from Greek, tetra- a numerical prefix referring to four and gnatha meaning "jaw". Evolution to cursorial behavior occurred long ago in a few different species, the most studied being those found on the Hawaiian islands. One of the biggest and most common species is T. extensa, which has a holarctic distribution. It can be found near lakes, river banks or swamps. Large numbers of individuals can often be found in reeds, tall grass, and around minor trees and shrubs.

Cursorial Species Found on Hawaiian Archipelago 
The Tetragnatha spiders found on the Hawaiian archipelago are believed to have no more than three colonization events, two from web building species and one from cursorial species. This is because a species of mainland Tetragnatha spider was found to be more closely related to web building spiders on the Hawaiian islands than the cursorial species. This means that the divergence of web building and cursorial spiders must have occurred off the islands. There have been many events of cursorial evolution in various spider species around the world, including a few Tetragnatha species, although many species have not been thoroughly studied. The factors leading to this change of behavior is not well understood, although study of the Hawaiian Tetragnatha species can lead to some suggestions. Environmental factors, such as landscape and prey diversity play an important role in influencing the structure of webs in web building spiders. This could be a reasonable explanation for the loss of web function and evolving to a cursorial behavior.

Species

 it contains 320 species and ten subspecies, found all over the world, including Greenland:

T. acuta Gillespie, 1992 – Hawaii
T. aenea Cantor, 1842 – China
T. aetherea (Simon, 1894) – Venezuela
T. albida Gillespie, 1994 – Hawaii
T. americana Simon, 1905 – Chile, Argentina
T. amoena Okuma, 1987 – New Guinea
T. anamitica Walckenaer, 1841 – Vietnam
T. andamanensis Tikader, 1977 – India (Andaman Is.), Bangladesh
T. andonea Lawrence, 1927 – Namibia
T. angolaensis Okuma & Dippenaar-Schoeman, 1988 – Angola
T. anguilla Thorell, 1877 – Indonesia (Java, Sulawesi), New Guinea, Australia
T. angulata Hogg, 1914 – Australia (Western Australia)
T. anuenue Gillespie, 2002 – Hawaii
T. argentinensis Mello-Leitão, 1931 – Argentina
T. argyroides Mello-Leitão, 1945 – Argentina
T. armata Karsch, 1892 – Sri Lanka
T. atriceps Banks, 1898 – Mexico
T. atristernis Strand, 1913 – Central Africa
T. australis (Mello-Leitão, 1945) – Argentina
T. baculiferens Hingston, 1927 – Myanmar
T. bandapula Barrion-Dupo, Barrion & Heong, 2013 – China
T. beccarii Caporiacco, 1947 – Guyana
T. bengalensis Walckenaer, 1841 – India
T. bicolor White, 1841 – Australia (Tasmania)
T. bidentata Roewer, 1951 – Chile
T. biseriata Thorell, 1881 – New Guinea, Papua New Guinea (New Britain), Australia (Queensland)
T. bishopi Caporiacco, 1947 – Guyana
T. bituberculata L. Koch, 1867 – Japan, New Guinea, Australia
T. boeleni Chrysanthus, 1975 – New Guinea
T. bogotensis Keyserling, 1865 – Mexico to Paraguay, Caribbean, Italy (Sardinia), Africa, Seychelles, Yemen, India, Nepal, China
T. boninensis Okuma, 1981 – Japan
T. brachychelis Caporiacco, 1947 – Tanzania, Kenya
T. branda Levi, 1981 – USA
T. brevignatha Gillespie, 1992 – Hawaii
T. bryantae Roewer, 1951 – Puerto Rico
T. caffra (Strand, 1909) – South Africa
T. cambridgei Roewer, 1942 – Mexico, Central America, Puerto Rico
T. caudata Emerton, 1884 – North, Central America, Cuba, Jamaica
T. caudicula (Karsch, 1879) – Russia (Far East), China, Korea, Taiwan, Japan
T. caudifera (Keyserling, 1887) – Australia (New South Wales)
T. cavaleriei Schenkel, 1963 – China
T. cephalothoracis Strand, 1906 – Ethiopia
T. ceylonica O. Pickard-Cambridge, 1869 – South Africa, Seychelles, India, Thailand, Philippines, New Guinea, Japan (Ryukyu Is.)
T. chamberlini (Gajbe, 2004) – India
T. chauliodus (Thorell, 1890) – India, Myanmar to New Guinea, Japan
T. cheni Zhu, Song & Zhang, 2003 – China
T. chinensis (Chamberlin, 1924) – China
Tetragnatha chiyokoae Castanheira & Baptista, 2020 — China, Taiwan, Japan
T. chrysochlora (Audouin, 1826) – Egypt
T. cladognatha Bertkau, 1880 – Brazil
T. clavigera Simon, 1887 – Sierra Leone, Ivory Coast, Congo
T. cochinensis Gravely, 1921 – India
T. coelestis Pocock, 1901 – India
T. cognata O. Pickard-Cambridge, 1889 – Guatemala to Panama
T. conica Grube, 1861 – Russia (Far East)
T. crassichelata Chrysanthus, 1975 – New Guinea
T. cuneiventris Simon, 1900 – Hawaii
T. cylindracea (Keyserling, 1887) – Australia (Queensland, New South Wales)
T. cylindrica Walckenaer, 1841 – New Guinea, Australia, Fiji
T. cylindriformis Lawrence, 1952 – Congo
T. dearmata Thorell, 1873 – North America, Europe, Caucasus, Russia (Europe to Far East)
T. delumbis Thorell, 1891 – India (Nicobar Is.)
T. demissa L. Koch, 1872 – Australia. Introduced to Cyprus, South Africa, Tanzania, Seychelles, Tonga
T. dentatidens Simon, 1907 – Sierra Leone, Congo
T. desaguni Barrion & Litsinger, 1995 – Philippines
T. determinata Karsch, 1892 – Sri Lanka
T. digitata O. Pickard-Cambridge, 1899 – Mexico, Costa Rica
T. eberhardi Okuma, 1992 – Panama
T. elongata Walckenaer, 1841 – Canada to Argentina, Caribbean
Tetragnatha e. debilis Thorell, 1877 – USA
Tetragnatha e. principalis Thorell, 1877 – USA
Tetragnatha e. undulata Thorell, 1877 – USA
T. elyunquensis Petrunkevitch, 1930 – Jamaica, Puerto Rico
T. esakii Okuma, 1988 – Taiwan
T. eumorpha Okuma, 1987 – New Guinea
T. eurychasma Gillespie, 1992 – Hawaii
T. exigua Chickering, 1957 – Jamaica
T. exquista Saito, 1933 – Japan
T. extensa (Linnaeus, 1758) (type) – North America, Greenland, Europe, Turkey, Caucasus, Russia (Europe to Far East), Iraq, Iran, Kazakhstan, Central Asia, China, Korea, Japan
Tetragnatha e. brachygnatha Thorell, 1873 – Sweden, Russia (Kamchatka)
Tetragnatha e. maracandica Charitonov, 1951 – Iran, Central Asia
Tetragnatha e. pulchra Kulczyński, 1891 – Hungary
T. fallax Thorell, 1881 – Indonesia
T. farri Chickering, 1962 – Jamaica
T. filiciphilia Gillespie, 1992 – Hawaii
T. filiformata Roewer, 1942 – Guyana
T. filigastra Mello-Leitão, 1943 – Brazil
T. filipes Schenkel, 1936 – China
T. filum Simon, 1907 – Congo, Equatorial Guinea (Bioko), São Tomé and Príncipe
T. flagellans Hasselt, 1882 – Indonesia (Sumatra)
T. flava (Audouin, 1826) – Egypt
T. flavida Urquhart, 1891 – New Zealand
T. fletcheri Gravely, 1921 – India, Bangladesh
T. foai Simon, 1902 – Central, East Africa
T. foliferens Hingston, 1927 – India (Nicobar Is.)
T. foveata Karsch, 1892 – Sri Lanka, Laccadive Is., Maldive Is.
T. fragilis Chickering, 1957 – Panama
T. franganilloi Brignoli, 1983 – Cuba
T. friedericii Strand, 1913 – New Guinea
T. gemmata L. Koch, 1872 – Australia (Queensland)
T. geniculata Karsch, 1892 – Sri Lanka to China, Vietnam
T. gertschi Chickering, 1957 – Panama
T. gibbula Roewer, 1942 – French Guiana
T. gongshan Zhao & Peng, 2010 – China
T. gracilis (Bryant, 1923) – USA, Antigua, Martinique
T. gracillima (Thorell, 1890) – Indonesia (Sumatra)
T. granti Pocock, 1903 – Yemen (Socotra)
T. gressitti Okuma, 1988 – Borneo
T. gressittorum Okuma, 1987 – New Guinea
T. guatemalensis O. Pickard-Cambridge, 1889 – North, Central America, Cuba, Jamaica
T. gui Zhu, Song & Zhang, 2003 – China
T. hamata Thorell, 1898 – Myanmar
T. hasselti Thorell, 1890 – India to China, Indonesia (Sulawesi)
Tetragnatha h. birmanica Sherriffs, 1919 – Myanmar
T. hastula Simon, 1907 – Sierra Leone, Gabon, São Tomé and Príncipe
T. hawaiensis Simon, 1900 – Hawaii
T. heongi Barrion & Barrion-Dupo, 2011 – China
T. hirashimai Okuma, 1987 – New Guinea
T. hiroshii Okuma, 1988 – Taiwan
T. hulli Caporiacco, 1955 – Venezuela
T. insularis Okuma, 1987 – Australia (Lord Howe Is.)
T. insulata Hogg, 1913 – Falkland Is.
T. insulicola Okuma, 1987 – Australia (Lord Howe Is.)
T. intermedia Kulczyński, 1891 – Madeira, Portugal to Turkey
T. iriomotensis Okuma, 1991 – Japan (Okinawa)
T. irridescens Stoliczka, 1869 – India
T. isidis (Simon, 1880) – Europe, Caucasus, Russia (Europe to Far East), Iran, Kazakhstan to India
T. iwahigensis Barrion & Litsinger, 1995 – Philippines
T. jaculator Tullgren, 1910 – Africa to China, New Guinea. Introduced to Barbados, Trinidad
T. javana (Thorell, 1890) – Africa, Asia
T. jejuna (Thorell, 1897) – Myanmar
T. josephi Okuma, 1988 – India, Malaysia, Singapore
T. jubensis Pavesi, 1895 – Ethiopia
T. kamakou Gillespie, 1992 – Hawaii
T. kapua Gillespie, 2003 – Marquesas Is.
T. kauaiensis Simon, 1900 – Hawaii
T. kea Gillespie, 1994 – Hawaii
T. keyserlingi Simon, 1890 – Central America, Caribbean, Brazil, Africa, Korea, India to Philippines, New Hebrides, Polynesia
T. khanjahani Biswas & Raychaudhuri, 1996 – Bangladesh
T. kikokiko Gillespie, 2002 – Hawaii
T. kiwuana Strand, 1913 – Central Africa
T. klossi Hogg, 1919 – Indonesia (Sumatra)
T. kolosvaryi Caporiacco, 1949 – Kenya
T. kukuhaa Gillespie, 2002 – Hawaii
T. kukuiki Gillespie, 2002 – Hawaii
T. labialis Nicolet, 1849 – Chile
T. laboriosa Hentz, 1850 – North, Central America
T. laminalis Strand, 1907 – East Africa
T. lancinans Kulczyński, 1911 – New Guinea
T. laochenga Barrion, Barrion-Dupo & Heong, 2013 – China
T. laqueata L. Koch, 1872 – Japan (Ogasawara Is.) to South Pacific Is.
T. latro Tullgren, 1910 – East Africa
T. lauta Yaginuma, 1959 – China (Hong Kong), Korea, Laos, Taiwan, Japan
T. lea Bösenberg & Strand, 1906 – Russia (Far East), Japan, Korea?
T. lena Gillespie, 2003 – Hawaii
T. lepida Rainbow, 1916 – Australia (Queensland)
T. levii Okuma, 1992 – Mexico
T. lewisi Chickering, 1962 – Jamaica
T. limu Gillespie, 2003 – Hawaii
T. linearis Nicolet, 1849 – Colombia, Chile
T. lineatula Roewer, 1942 – Malaysia
T. linyphioides Karsch, 1878 – Mozambique
T. llavaca Barrion & Litsinger, 1995 – Philippines
T. longidens Mello-Leitão, 1945 – Argentina, Brazil
T. luculenta Simon, 1907 – Guinea-Bissau
T. luteocincta Simon, 1908 – Australia (Western Australia)
T. mabelae Chickering, 1957 – Panama, Trinidad
T. macilenta L. Koch, 1872 – Australia (Norfolk Is.) to French Polynesia (Society Is.)
T. macracantha Gillespie, 1992 – Hawaii
T. macrops Simon, 1907 – São Tomé and Príncipe
T. maculata Blackwall, 1865 – Cape Verde Is.
T. maeandrata Simon, 1908 – Australia (Western Australia)
T. maka Gillespie, 1994 – Hawaii
T. makiharai Okuma, 1977 – Russia (Far East), Japan (mainland, Ryukyu Is.)
T. mandibulata Walckenaer, 1841 – Central America, Caribbean, Guyana, Brazil, West Africa, India to Philippines, Australia
T. maralba Roberts, 1983 – Seychelles (Aldabra)
T. margaritata L. Koch, 1872 – Australia (Queensland)
T. marginata (Thorell, 1890) – Myanmar to New Caledonia
T. marquesiana Berland, 1935 – Marquesas Is.
T. martinicensis Dierkens, 2011 – Martinique
T. mawambina Strand, 1913 – Central Africa
Tetragnatha megalocera Castanheira & Baptista, 2020 — Brazil
T. mengsongica Zhu, Song & Zhang, 2003 – China
T. mertoni Strand, 1911 – Indonesia (Aru Is.)
T. mexicana Keyserling, 1865 – Mexico to Panama
T. micrura Kulczyński, 1911 – New Guinea, Solomon Is.
T. minitabunda O. Pickard-Cambridge, 1872 – Syria, Lebanon, Israel
T. modica Kulczyński, 1911 – New Guinea
T. mohihi Gillespie, 1992 – Hawaii
T. montana Simon, 1874 – Europe, Turkey, Caucasus, Russia (Europe to Far East), Central Asia
Tetragnatha m. timorensis Schenkel, 1944 – Timor
T. monticola Okuma, 1987 – New Guinea
T. moua Gillespie, 2003 – Tahiti
T. moulmeinensis Gravely, 1921 – Myanmar
T. multipunctata Urquhart, 1891 – New Zealand
T. nana Okuma, 1987 – New Guinea
T. nandan Zhu, Song & Zhang, 2003 – China
T. nepaeformis Doleschall, 1859 – Indonesia (Java)
T. nero Butler, 1876 – Mauritius (Rodriguez)
T. netrix Simon, 1900 – Hawaii
T. nigricans Dalmas, 1917 – New Zealand
T. nigrigularis Simon, 1898 – Seychelles
T. nigrita Lendl, 1886 – Europe, Caucasus, Russia (Europe to Far East), Central Asia, China, Japan
T. niokolona Roewer, 1961 – Senegal
T. nitens (Audouin, 1826) – Asia. Introduced to the Americas, Madeira, Canary Is., Mediterranean, Madagascar, Pacific islands, New Zealand
T. nitidiuscula Simon, 1907 – West Africa
T. nitidiventris Simon, 1907 – Guinea-Bissau
T. notophilla Boeris, 1889 – Peru
T. noumeensis Berland, 1924 – New Caledonia
T. novia Simon, 1901 – Malaysia
T. nubica Denis, 1955 – Niger
T. obscura Gillespie, 2002 – Hawaii
T. obscuriceps Caporiacco, 1940 – Ethiopia
T. obtusa C. L. Koch, 1837 – Europe, Turkey, Caucasus, Russia (Europe to Far East), Central Asia
Tetragnatha o. corsica Simon, 1929 – France (Corsica)
T. oculata Denis, 1955 – Niger
T. okumae Barrion & Litsinger, 1995 – Philippines
T. olindana Karsch, 1880 – Polynesia
T. oomua Gillespie, 2003 – Marquesas Is.
T. oreobia Okuma, 1987 – New Guinea
T. orizaba (Banks, 1898) – Mexico, Cuba, Jamaica
T. oubatchensis Berland, 1924 – New Caledonia
T. palikea Gillespie, 2003 – Hawaii
T. pallescens F. O. Pickard-Cambridge, 1903 – North, Central America, Caribbean
T. pallida O. Pickard-Cambridge, 1889 – Costa Rica, Panama
T. paludicola Gillespie, 1992 – Hawaii
T. paludis Caporiacco, 1940 – Ethiopia
T. panopea L. Koch, 1872 - Polynesia and Lord Howe Island
T. papuana Kulczyński, 1911 – New Guinea
T. paradisea Pocock, 1901 – India
T. paradoxa Okuma, 1992 – Costa Rica
T. paraguayensis (Mello-Leitão, 1939) – Paraguay
T. parva Badcock, 1932 – Paraguay
T. parvula Thorell, 1891 – India (Nicobar Is.)
T. paschae Berland, 1924 – Easter Is.
T. perkinsi Simon, 1900 – Hawaii
T. perreirai Gillespie, 1992 – Hawaii
T. phaeodactyla Kulczyński, 1911 – New Guinea
T. pilosa Gillespie, 1992 – Hawaii
T. pinicola L. Koch, 1870 – Europe, Turkey, Caucasus, Russia (Europe to Far East), Central Asia, China, Korea, Japan
T. piscatoria Simon, 1898 – Caribbean
T. planata Karsch, 1892 – Sri Lanka
T. plena Chamberlin, 1924 – China
T. polychromata Gillespie, 1992 – Hawaii
T. praedonia L. Koch, 1878 – Russia (Far East), China, Laos, Korea, Taiwan, Japan
T. priamus Okuma, 1987 – Solomon Is.
T. protensa Walckenaer, 1841 – Madagascar to Australia, New Caledonia, Palau Is.
T. pseudonitens Barrion, Barrion-Dupo & Heong, 2013 – China
T. puella Thorell, 1895 – Myanmar, Indonesia (Sumatra), New Guinea
T. pulchella Thorell, 1877 – Indonesia (Sumatra, Sulawesi)
T. punua Gillespie, 2003 – Marquesas Is.
T. quadrinotata Urquhart, 1893 – Australia (Tasmania)
T. quasimodo Gillespie, 1992 – Hawaii
T. quechua Chamberlin, 1916 – Peru
T. radiata Chrysanthus, 1975 – New Guinea
T. rava Gillespie, 2003 – Tahiti
T. reimoseri (Rosca, 1939) – Central, Eastern Europe
Tetragnatha renatoi Castanheira & Baptista, 2020 — Venezuela, Brazil, Argentina
T. reni Zhu, Song & Zhang, 2003 – China
T. restricta Simon, 1900 – Hawaii
T. retinens Chamberlin, 1924 – China
T. rimandoi Barrion, 1998 – Philippines
T. rimitarae Strand, 1911 – Polynesia
T. riveti Berland, 1913 – Ecuador
T. roeweri Caporiacco, 1949 – Kenya
T. rossi Chrysanthus, 1975 – New Guinea
T. rouxi (Berland, 1924) – New Caledonia
T. rubriventris Doleschall, 1857 – New Guinea, Australia (Queensland)
T. scopus Chamberlin, 1916 – Peru
T. serra Doleschall, 1857 – Thailand to China (Hong Kong), New Guinea
T. shanghaiensis Strand, 1907 – China
T. shinanoensis Okuma & Chikuni, 1978 – Korea, Japan
T. shoshone Levi, 1981 – USA, Canada, Europe, Kazakhstan, Mongolia, China
T. sidama Caporiacco, 1940 – Ethiopia
T. signata Okuma, 1987 – New Guinea
T. similis Nicolet, 1849 – Chile
T. simintina Roewer, 1961 – Senegal
T. sinuosa Chickering, 1957 – Panama
T. sobrina Simon, 1900 – Hawaii
T. sociella Chamberlin, 1924 – China
T. squamata Karsch, 1879 – Russia (Far East), China, Korea, Taiwan, Japan
T. stelarobusta Gillespie, 1992 – Hawaii
T. stellarum Chrysanthus, 1975 – New Guinea
T. sternalis Nicolet, 1849 – Chile
T. stimulifera Simon, 1907 – Congo
T. straminea Emerton, 1884 – USA, Canada, Cuba
T. strandi Lessert, 1915 – East, Southern Africa
Tetragnatha s. melanogaster Schmidt & Krause, 1993 – Comoros
T. streichi Strand, 1907 – China
T. striata L. Koch, 1862 – Europe, Russia (Europe to South Siberia), Kazakhstan
T. subclavigera Strand, 1907 – Congo
T. subesakii Zhu, Song & Zhang, 2003 – China
T. subextensa Petrunkevitch, 1930 – Jamaica, Puerto Rico
T. subsquamata Okuma, 1985 – Tanzania, South Africa
T. suoan Zhu, Song & Zhang, 2003 – China
T. sutherlandi Gravely, 1921 – India
T. tahuata Gillespie, 2003 – Marquesas Is.
T. tanigawai Okuma, 1988 – Japan (Ryukyu Is.)
T. tantalus Gillespie, 1992 – Hawaii
T. taylori O. Pickard-Cambridge, 1891 – South Africa
T. tenera Thorell, 1881 – India, Sri Lanka, Australia (Queensland)
T. tenuis O. Pickard-Cambridge, 1889 – Guatemala to Panama
T. tenuissima O. Pickard-Cambridge, 1889 – Mexico, Caribbean to Brazil
T. tincochacae Chamberlin, 1916 – Peru
T. tipula (Simon, 1894) – West Africa
T. tonkina Simon, 1909 – Vietnam
T. torrensis Schmidt & Piepho, 1994 – Cape Verde Is.
T. trichodes Thorell, 1878 – Indonesia
T. tristani Banks, 1909 – Costa Rica
T. trituberculata Gillespie, 1992 – Hawaii
T. tuamoaa Gillespie, 2003 – Society Is.
T. tullgreni Lessert, 1915 – Central, East Africa
T. uluhe Gillespie, 2003 – Hawaii
T. uncifera Simon, 1900 – Hawaii
T. unicornis Tullgren, 1910 – East, South Africa
T. vacillans (Butler, 1876) – Mauritius (Rodriguez)
T. valida Keyserling, 1887 – Australia (Queensland, New South Wales, Tasmania)
T. vermiformis Emerton, 1884 – Temperate and tropical Asia. Introduced to North and Central America, Brazil
T. versicolor Walckenaer, 1841 – North, Central America, Cuba
T. virescens Okuma, 1979 – Bangladesh, Sri Lanka to Indonesia, Philippines
T. viridis Walckenaer, 1841 – USA, Canada
T. viridorufa Gravely, 1921 – India
T. visenda Chickering, 1957 – Jamaica
T. waikamoi Gillespie, 1992 – Hawaii
T. yalom Chrysanthus, 1975 – New Guinea, Papua New Guinea (Bismarck Arch.), Australia (Queensland)
T. yesoensis Saito, 1934 – Russia (Far East), China, Korea, Japan
T. yinae Zhao & Peng, 2010 – China
T. yongquiang Zhu, Song & Zhang, 2003 – China
T. zangherii (Caporiacco, 1926) – Italy
T. zhaoi Zhu, Song & Zhang, 2003 – China
T. zhaoya Zhu, Song & Zhang, 2003 – China
T. zhuzhenrongi Barrion, Barrion-Dupo & Heong, 2013 – China

In synonymy:

T. aduncata Wang, 1991 = Tetragnatha hasselti Thorell, 1890
T. alba F. O. Pickard-Cambridge, 1903 = Tetragnatha laboriosa Hentz, 1850
T. amplidens Chamberlin & Ivie, 1936 = Tetragnatha elongata Walckenaer, 1841
T. andina Taczanowski, 1878 = Tetragnatha bogotensis Keyserling, 1865
T. anirensis Strand, 1915 = Tetragnatha biseriata Thorell, 1881
T. antillana Simon, 1897 = Tetragnatha nitens (Audouin, 1826)
T. apheles Chamberlin & Ivie, 1936 = Tetragnatha mexicana Keyserling, 1865
T. aptans Chamberlin, 1920 = Tetragnatha nitens (Audouin, 1826)
T. banksi McCook, 1894 = Tetragnatha guatemalensis O. Pickard-Cambridge, 1889
T. bemalcuei Mello-Leitão, 1939 = Tetragnatha bogotensis Keyserling, 1865
T. borealis L. Koch, 1879 = Tetragnatha dearmata Thorell, 1873
T. boydi O. Pickard-Cambridge, 1898 = Tetragnatha bogotensis Keyserling, 1865
T. boydi Tullgren, 1910 = Tetragnatha bogotensis Keyserling, 1865
T. caporiaccoi Platnick, 1993 = Tetragnatha nitens (Audouin, 1826)
T. casula Walckenaer, 1841 = Tetragnatha versicolor Walckenaer, 1841
T. cliens Chamberlin, 1924 = Tetragnatha nigrita Lendl, 1886
T. conformans Chamberlin, 1924 = Tetragnatha keyserlingi Simon, 1890
T. confraterna Banks, 1909 = Tetragnatha mandibulata Walckenaer, 1841
T. convexa Banks, 1898 = Tetragnatha versicolor Walckenaer, 1841
T. coreana Seo & Paik, 1981 = Tetragnatha vermiformis Emerton, 1884
T. culicivora Walckenaer, 1841 = Tetragnatha elongata Walckenaer, 1841
T. decipiens Badcock, 1932 = Tetragnatha nitens (Audouin, 1826)
T. dentigera F. O. Pickard-Cambridge, 1903 = Tetragnatha versicolor Walckenaer, 1841
T. earmra Levi, 1981 = Tetragnatha gracilis (Bryant, 1923)
T. eitapensis Strand, 1913 = Tetragnatha ceylonica O. Pickard-Cambridge, 1869
T. elmora Chamberlin & Ivie, 1942 = Tetragnatha nitens (Audouin, 1826)
T. ethodon Chamberlin & Ivie, 1936 = Tetragnatha keyserlingi Simon, 1890
T. festina Bryant, 1945 = Tetragnatha nitens (Audouin, 1826)
T. filiformis (Audouin, 1826) = Tetragnatha flava (Audouin, 1826)
T. foliifera Simon, 1898 = Tetragnatha demissa L. Koch, 1872
T. fraterna Banks, 1898 = Tetragnatha guatemalensis O. Pickard-Cambridge, 1889
T. fuerteventurensis Wunderlich, 1992 = Tetragnatha nitens (Audouin, 1826)
T. galapagoensis Banks, 1902 = Tetragnatha nitens (Audouin, 1826)
T. graciliventris Schenkel, 1963 = Tetragnatha mandibulata Walckenaer, 1841
T. grenda Roberts, 1983 = Tetragnatha demissa L. Koch, 1872
T. groenlandica Thorell, 1872 = Tetragnatha extensa (Linnaeus, 1758)
T. haitiensis Bryant, 1945 = Tetragnatha bogotensis Keyserling, 1865
T. harrodi Levi, 1951 = Tetragnatha dearmata Thorell, 1873
T. heatwolei Chrysanthus, 1975 = Tetragnatha bituberculata L. Koch, 1867
T. hotingchiehi Schenkel, 1963 = Tetragnatha nitens (Audouin, 1826)
T. huahinensis Berland, 1942 = Tetragnatha macilenta L. Koch, 1872
T. infuscata Benoit, 1978 = Tetragnatha mandibulata Walckenaer, 1841
T. intermedia Banks, 1898 = Tetragnatha guatemalensis O. Pickard-Cambridge, 1889
T. japonica Bösenberg & Strand, 1906 = Tetragnatha keyserlingi Simon, 1890
T. kaestneri (Crome, 1954) = Tetragnatha reimoseri (Rosca, 1939)
T. kochi Thorell, 1895 = Tetragnatha keyserlingi Simon, 1890
T. kovblyuki Marusik, 2010 = Tetragnatha shoshone Levi, 1981
T. laudativa Gertsch & Mulaik, 1936 = Tetragnatha guatemalensis O. Pickard-Cambridge, 1889
T. limnocharis Seeley, 1928 = Tetragnatha versicolor Walckenaer, 1841
T. listeri Gravely, 1921 = Tetragnatha keyserlingi Simon, 1890
T. mackenziei Gravely, 1921 = Tetragnatha vermiformis Emerton, 1884
T. maderiana Schenkel, 1938 (described as subspecies of T. extensa) = Tetragnatha extensa (Linnaeus, 1758)
T. mandibulata Gravely, 1921 = Tetragnatha bogotensis Keyserling, 1865
T. manitoba Chamberlin & Ivie, 1942 = Tetragnatha extensa (Linnaeus, 1758)
T. marianna Archer, 1940 = Tetragnatha versicolor Walckenaer, 1841
T. maxillosa Thorell, 1895 = Tetragnatha keyserlingi Simon, 1890
T. maxillosa Strand, 1911 = Tetragnatha keyserlingi Simon, 1890
T. modesta Hirst, 1911 = Tetragnatha ceylonica O. Pickard-Cambridge, 1869
T. munda Chamberlin & Gertsch, 1929 = Tetragnatha versicolor Walckenaer, 1841
T. necatoria Tullgren, 1910 = Tetragnatha mandibulata Walckenaer, 1841
T. nigrita Strand, 1906 = Tetragnatha praedonia L. Koch, 1878
T. nitens (Hogg, 1911) = Tetragnatha nitens (Audouin, 1826)
T. nitens Wiehle, 1962 = Tetragnatha bogotensis Keyserling, 1865
T. numa Levi & Levi, 1955 = Tetragnatha laboriosa Hentz, 1850
T. obtusa Kulczyński, 1891 = Tetragnatha dearmata Thorell, 1873
T. pelusia (Audouin, 1826) = Tetragnatha nitens (Audouin, 1826)
T. peninsulana Banks, 1898 = Tetragnatha bogotensis Keyserling, 1865
T. peruviana Taczanowski, 1878 = Tetragnatha nitens (Audouin, 1826)
T. petrunkevitchi Caporiacco, 1947 = Tetragnatha mandibulata Walckenaer, 1841
T. pinea Seeley, 1928 = Tetragnatha viridis Walckenaer, 1841
T. potanini Schenkel, 1963 = Tetragnatha extensa (Linnaeus, 1758)
T. producta (Franganillo, 1930) = Tetragnatha nitens (Audouin, 1826)
T. propioides Schenkel, 1936 = Tetragnatha keyserlingi Simon, 1890
T. punctipes Westring, 1874 = Tetragnatha dearmata Thorell, 1873
T. qiuae Zhu, Song & Zhang, 2003 = Tetragnatha shoshone Levi, 1981
T. quadridens Dondale, 1966 = Tetragnatha demissa L. Koch, 1872
T. ramboi Mello-Leitão, 1943 = Tetragnatha bogotensis Keyserling, 1865
T. recurva Schenkel, 1936 = Tetragnatha squamata Karsch, 1879
T. rusticana Chickering, 1959 = Tetragnatha extensa (Linnaeus, 1758)
T. sanctitata Walckenaer, 1841 = Tetragnatha elongata Walckenaer, 1841
T. seminola Gertsch, 1936 = Tetragnatha nitens (Audouin, 1826)
T. seneca Seeley, 1928 = Tetragnatha guatemalensis O. Pickard-Cambridge, 1889
T. shikokiana Yaginuma, 1960 = Tetragnatha vermiformis Emerton, 1884
T. siduo Chamberlin & Ivie, 1936 = Tetragnatha elongata Walckenaer, 1841
T. soaresi Camargo, 1950 = Tetragnatha longidens Mello-Leitão, 1945
T. steckleri Gertsch & Ivie, 1936 = Tetragnatha nitens (Audouin, 1826)
T. trapezoides Walckenaer, 1841 = Tetragnatha versicolor Walckenaer, 1841
T. tropica O. Pickard-Cambridge, 1889 = Tetragnatha elongata Walckenaer, 1841
T. valoka Chrysanthus, 1975 = Tetragnatha biseriata Thorell, 1881
T. vermiventris Schenkel, 1963 = Tetragnatha javana (Thorell, 1890)
T. vicina Simon, 1897 = Tetragnatha nitens (Audouin, 1826)

See also
 List of Tetragnathidae species

References

Araneomorphae genera
Cosmopolitan spiders
Taxa named by Pierre André Latreille
Tetragnathidae